Michael George Dean (born March 1, 1965) is an American hip hop record producer, audio engineer, songwriter,  and multi-instrumentalist from Houston, Texas. He is best known for recording and mixing songs and synthesizers for major artists across the American hip hop industry such as Kanye West, Kid Cudi, 2Pac, Scarface, Travis Scott, 2 Chainz, Jay-Z, Beyoncé, Desiigner, Drake, Madonna, Selena Gomez, Lana Del Rey, and The Weeknd. He has released three solo studio albums: 4:20 on April 20, 2020, 4:22, on April 22, 2021, and Smoke State 42222 on April 22, 2022.

Career
Mike Dean started doing collaborations with numerous Texan artists, including Selena, for whom Dean served as musical director and producer. Dean first became widely known for pioneering the Dirty South sound in the 1990s, particularly in work for artists from Rap-A-Lot Records. Dean has most notably worked alongside Scarface of the Geto Boys, Do or Die, Tha Dogg Pound, Yukmouth of the Luniz, C-Bo, Nate Dogg, Tech N9ne, UGK, Z-Ro, Devin the Dude, Outlawz, and 2Pac.

Dean went on to mix, produce, and master widely throughout American hip hop. He has become known for producing work with Kanye West. After initially contributing to the mixing of West's albums The College Dropout and Late Registration, Dean contributed as producer on West's Graduation, My Beautiful Dark Twisted Fantasy, Yeezus, The Life of Pablo, Ye, and Donda albums. He also co-produced with West on his collaboration album with Jay-Z, Watch the Throne. Dean was an additional producer on "Mercy" and "Higher" on GOOD Music's 2012 compilation album Cruel Summer. Dean has made particularly heavy contributions on West's last albums, and is credited on most tracks.

In recent years, Mike Dean has served as a regular guitarist and keyboardist for Kanye West and Travis Scott at their live performances, headlining numerous music festivals, the Watch the Throne Tour, the Yeezus Tour and Travis Scott's Birds Eye View tour as well as the Astroworld - Wish You Were Here Tour. Dean has also been a frequent collaborator with Travis Scott. Dean's production has appeared on every one of Scott's musical bodies of work from 2013 to the present. In 2016, Dean mastered Frank Ocean's visual album Endless, wrote and produced tracks on Desiigner's mixtape New English, and produced Desiigner's single "Tiimmy Turner".

In May 2017, Dean announced he was launching a record label by the name of M.W.A. When asked what made him decide that now would be the best time to unveil his new record label, Dean responded: "Just a lot of new young artists that's been asking to get down with me and have me work on their projects and help them get deals. I figured I'd start a label and sign some new acts. Seems like a good time to start it. I got a studio out here [in Los Angeles] and I'm able to meet a lot of new artists." When asked the meaning of M.W.A, Dean answered: "That's just what I call myself when I DJ. Mexican Wrestling Association. It's something that I've done with the merch, so I just figured I'd keep the name going." He also revealed Dice Soho the first artist he signed to M.W.A: "One of my homies Gustavo Guerra brought [Dice Soho] to me. I think he's gonna be the next wave out of Houston. I picked him up. Dice has a nice swag."

He released an instrumental mixtape, 4:20, on April 20, 2020. On May 20, 2021, the Lana Del Rey single "Wildflower Wildfire" was released, which was produced by Dean. In an interview with Anthony Fantano before the song's release, Dean said that he was "planning on working with [Del Rey] a lot".

Discography

As featuring artist
 2020: Together (with Carnage and The Martinez Brothers featuring Elderbrook and Mike Dean)

Production discography

1980s
Def Squad, Texas

1990s
1992
Bushwick Bill – Little Big Man
UGK – Too Hard to Swallow
Willie D – I'm Goin' Out Lika Soldier

1993
5th Ward Boyz – Ghetto Dope
Ganksta NIP – Psychic Thoughts
DMG – Rigormortiz

1994
5th Ward Boyz – Gangsta Funk
Big Mello – Wegonefunkwichamind
Big Mike – Somethin' Serious
Blac Monks – Secrets of the Hidden Temple
Odd Squad – Fadanuf Fa Erybody!!
Scarface – The Diary

1995
5th Ward Boyz – Rated G
Jamal – Last Chance, No Breaks
Menace Clan – Da Hood

1996
3-2 – Wicked Buddah Baby
Do or Die – Picture This
Facemob – The Other Side of the Law
Ganksta N-I-P – Psychotic Genius
Geto Boys – The Resurrection

1997
3X Krazy – Stackin' Chips
Big Mike – Still Serious
Scarface –The Untouchable
Seagram – Souls on Ice

1998
A-G-2-A-Ke – Mil-Ticket
Devin the Dude – The Dude
Do or Die – Headz Or Tailz
Ganksta N-I-P – Interview with a Killa
Yukmouth – Thugged Out: The Albulation

2000s

2000
C-Bo – Enemy of the State
Outlawz – Ride Wit Us Or Collide Wit Us
Scarface – Last of a Dying Breed

2001
Oz (soundtrack)
Tha Dogg Pound – Dillinger & Young Gotti
Yukmouth – Thug Lord: The New Testament
Sherm – Sherm Smoke

2002
Big Syke – Big Syke
Daz Dillinger – This Is The Life I Lead
Devin the Dude – Just Tryin' ta Live
E-40 – Grit & Grind
Hussein Fatal – Fatal
Kastro & E.D.I. – Blood Brothers
King Tee – Thy Kingdom Come
Scarface – The Fix
Young Noble – Noble Justice

2003
Yukmouth – Godzilla
2004
Z-Ro – The Life of Joseph W. McVey
Shyne – Godfather Buried Alive
Kanye West - The College Dropout

2005
Geto Boys – The Foundation
Pimp C – Sweet James Jones Stories
Z-Ro – Let the Truth Be Told
Kanye West – Late Registration

2006
Juvenile – Reality Check
Pimp C – Pimpalation
Z-Ro – I'm Still Livin'

2007
Kanye West – Graduation
Scarface – Made

2008
Kanye West – 808's and Heartbreak

2009
Mike Jones – The Voice
UGK – UGK 4 Life

2010s

2010
Kanye West – My Beautiful Dark Twisted Fantasy
Kid Cudi – Man On The Moon II: The Legend Of Mr. Rager
Z-Ro – Heroin

2011
Kanye West & Jay-Z – Watch the Throne

2012
GOOD Music – Cruel Summer

2013
Beyoncé – BEYONCÉ
Jay-Z – Magna Carta... Holy Grail
Kanye West – Yeezus
Angel Haze – Dirty Gold
Travis Scott – Owl Pharaoh

2014
Travis Scott – Days Before Rodeo
 Freddie Gibbs & Mike Dean – GTA 5 :Radio Los Santos - “Sellin’ Dope”

2015
Madonna – Rebel Heart
Travis Scott – Rodeo
The Weeknd – Where You Belong
Freddie Gibbs – Shadow of a Doubt
The Weeknd - Beauty Behind the Madness

2016
Beyoncé – Lemonade
Kanye West – The Life of Pablo
Desiigner – New English
Frank Ocean – Endless
Frank Ocean – Blonde
Travis Scott – Birds in the Trap Sing McKnight
Ty Dolla Sign – Campaign
Yung Lean – Warlord
2 Chainz – Hibachi for Lunch
Kid Cudi – Passion, Pain & Demon Slayin'
Z-Ro – Legendary

2017
2 Chainz – Pretty Girls Like Trap Music
Vic Mensa – The Autobiography
Lunice – CCCLX
Ty Dolla Sign – Beach House 3
Travis Scott & Quavo – Huncho Jack, Jack Huncho

2018
AJ Mitchell – Used to Be
Migos – Culture II
Desiigner - L.O.D.
Pusha T – DAYTONA
Kanye West – ye
Dermot Kennedy – Mike Dean Presents: Dermot Kennedy
Kids See Ghosts – KIDS SEE GHOSTS
Christina Aguilera – Liberation
Nas – NASIR
The Carters – Everything Is Love
Teyana Taylor – K.T.S.E.
Travis Scott – Astroworld
Trippie Redd — Life's a Trip
Genetikk – Y.A.L.A

2019
2 Chainz – Rap or Go to the League
Madonna – Madame X
Maxo Kream – Brandon Banks
Kanye West – Jesus is King
City Morgue – City Morgue Vol 2: As Good As Dead
Smokepurpp – Deadstar 2
Sunday Service Choir – Jesus Is Born
JackBoys and Travis Scott – JackBoys

2020s
2020
Selena Gomez – Rare
070 Shake – Modus Vivendi
Don Toliver – Heaven Or Hell
Mike Dean – 4:20
Pop Smoke – Shoot for the Stars, Aim for the Moon
Burna Boy – Twice As Tall
Kid Cudi – Man on the Moon III: The Chosen

2021
Mike Dean – 4:22
Kanye West – Donda
Lana Del Rey – Blue Banisters
Maxo Kream - Weight of the World
Don Toliver – Life of a Don
Rich The Kid - BLUE CHEESE
Aaliyah feat. The Weeknd - "Poison"

2022
FKA twigs - Caprisongs
Pusha T - It's Almost Dry
Mike Dean - Smoke State 42222
Megan Thee Stallion - "Plan B"
Weiland - Vices
Kanye West - Donda 2
The Weeknd - "Starry Eyes (Mike Dean Remix)"
Beyoncé – Renaissance
Christine and the Queens - Redcar les adorables étoiles (prologue)

Filmography

Awards and nominations

Grammy Awards

!
|-
|2005
| The College Dropout (as engineer/mixer)
| Album of the Year
|
|rowspan="23"|
|-
|rowspan="3"|2006
| "Gold Digger" (as engineer/mixer)
| Record of the Year
|
|-
|rowspan="2"|Late Registration (as engineer/mixer)
| Best Rap Album
|
|-
|rowspan="2"| Album of the Year
| 
|-
|rowspan="3"|2008
|rowspan="2"|Graduation (as engineer)
| 
|-
| Best Rap Album
| 
|-
|"Good Life" (as songwriter)
|Best Rap Song
|
|-
|2012
|My Beautiful Dark Twisted Fantasy (as engineer/mixer)
|Best Rap Album
|
|-
|rowspan="2"|2013
|"Ni**as In Paris" (as songwriter)
|rowspan="5"|Best Rap Song
|
|-
|"Mercy" (as songwriter)
|
|-
|rowspan="1"|2014
|"New Slaves" (as songwriter)
|
|-
|rowspan="1"|2015
|"Bound 2" (as songwriter)
|
|-
|rowspan="2"|2016
|"All Day" (as songwriter)
|
|-
|Beauty Behind the Madness (as producer)
|rowspan="3"|Album of the Year
| 
|-
|rowspan="4"|2017
|Lemonade (as producer)
| 
|-
|Purpose (as producer)
| 
|-
| "Famous" (as songwriter)
| rowspan="3"|Best Rap Song
| 
|-
| "Ultralight Beam" (as songwriter)
| 
|-
|2019
|"Sicko Mode" (as songwriter)
| 
|-
|2021
| Jesus Is King (as engineer/mixer)
| Best Contemporary Christian Music Album
| 
|-
| rowspan="2"|2022
| "Jail" (as songwriter)
| Best Rap Song
| 
|-
|Donda (as producer and songwriter)
| rowspan="2"| Album of the Year
| 
|-
| 2023
| Renaissance (as producer and songwriter)
|

See also
Houston hip hop
Kanye West

References

External links
Official website
NPR: Mike Dean on working with Selena, Scarface, and Kanye
Mike Dean at Grammy.com

Living people
1965 births
People from Houston
American hip hop record producers
American audio engineers
Southern hip hop musicians
20th-century American guitarists
21st-century American guitarists
Guitarists from Texas
20th-century American pianists
Grammy Award winners for rap music
American male pianists
21st-century American pianists
Record producers from Texas
20th-century American male musicians
21st-century American male musicians
Trap musicians
American multi-instrumentalists